Agler is a surname. Notable people with the surname include:

Bob Agler (1924–2005), American football player
Brian Agler (born 1958), American basketball player and coach
Jesse Agler, American sportscaster
Jim Agler, American mathematician 
Joe Agler (1887–1971), American baseball player

Other uses
 Agler-La Follette House